The Ngiyampaa,  also known as the Ngemba, are an Aboriginal Australian people of the state of New South Wales. The generic name refers to an aggregation of three groups, the Ngiyampaa, the Ngiyampaa Wangaaypuwan, and the Ngiyampaa Weilwan, respectively clans of a larger Ngiyampaa nation.

Language

Their language consisted of varieties of Ngiyampaa, which was composed of two dialects, Ngiyambaa Wangaaybuwan and  Wayilwan Ngiyambaa.  The Wangaaypuwan (with wangaay) people are so called because they use wangaay to say "no", as opposed to the Ngiyampaa in the Macquarie Marshes and towards Walgett, who were historically defined separately by colonial ethnographers as Weilwan, so-called because their word for "no" was wayil. The distinction between Ngiyampaa, Wangaaypuwan/Wangaibon and Weilwan traditionally drawn, and sanctioned by the classification of Norman Tindale, may rest upon a flawed assumption of marked "tribal" differences based on Ngiyampaa linguistic discriminations between internal groups or clans whose word for "no" varied.

Country
Their area included Yanda Creek down to the source of Mulga Creek, and took in the Bogan River. The Weilwan clan were on their southeastern flank, the Wangaaypuwan clan southwest while the Gamilaraay were to the northeast and the Paakantyi to their west and northwest.

Group classifications
A geographical distinction regarding the homeland camping world (ngurrampaa) is attested between three groups, all inhabiting areas devoid of permanent watercourses.
 (a) pilaarrkiyalu ('woodlanders'. Lit.'belar people') to the east.
 (b) nhiilyikiyalu (nilyah tree people) a westerly group who formerly camped northwest of the ngurrampaa, around Marfield station.

These two groups are collectively referred to as drylanders.
 (c)karulkiyalu or 'stone people', those associated with the stony terrain north of the Ngiyampaa's camping world.

A further distinction was drawn between the above three groups and two groups of river people whose descendants now dwell to the east and west of the ngurrampaa. These are the
 (d) kaliyarrkiyalu (people of the Lachlan River (kaliyarr)
 (e) paawankay (people of the Darling River).

History of contact
In 1914 a regional newspaper stated that there had been a massacre in 1859 of around 300 Ngiyampaa at Hospital Creek, close to Brewarrina.

Some words
 ngurram-paa ('camp-world', therefore homeland)
 ngurrangkiyalu (housewife)
 purrpa (school for making men)
 waaway (Rainbow Serpent)
 wirringan (doctors or 'clever' people)

Notes

Citations

Sources

.

Aboriginal peoples of New South Wales
South Coast (New South Wales)